Peter of Portugal (Portuguese: Pedro) is the name of several Portuguese kings and infantes:

Kings:
 Peter I of Portugal (1320–1367)
 Peter II of Portugal (1648–1706)
 Peter III of Portugal (1717–1786), King Consort of Portugal on the succession of his wife and niece Queen Mary I of Portugal
 Peter IV of Portugal (1798–1834), also Peter I, Emperor of Brazil
 Peter V of Portugal (1837–1861)

Infantes:
 Infante Pedro, Count of Urgell (1187–1258), son of Sancho I of Portugal and Dulce of Aragon
 Infante Pedro of Portugal (1370–1370), son of Ferdinand I of Portugal and Leonor Telles de Menezes
 Infante Pedro, Duke of Coimbra (1392–1449), son of John I of Portugal and Philippa of Lancaster
 Peter V of Aragon, Infante Pedro, titular King of Aragon (1429–1466), son of Infante Pedro, Duke of Coimbra, and Isabella of Urgell
 Pedro, Prince of Brazil (1712–1714), son of John V of Portugal and Mary Anne of Austria
 Dom Pedro II of Brazil (Peter II; 1825–1891), Emperor of Brazil following his father Pedro IV (Peter IV) of Portugal (I of Brazil). He was never an infante of Portugal for having been born after Brazil's independence